Molding or moulding may refer to:

 Molding (decorative) or coving, a decorative feature along walls and ceilings, formed from marble, plaster, wood, etc.
 Molding (process), in manufacturing
 Automotive molding
 Mold (cooking implement)

See also 
 Mold (disambiguation)